The National CBRN Defence Centre is a Swedish military unit with expertise regarding chemical, biological, radiological and nuclear defense used by both the army, marines and the air force. The unit has been existing in different forms since 1953. Totalförsvarets skyddscentrum is localised together with Västerbottensgruppen (UG 61) within Umeå Garrison (also known as Umestan), which is the barracks that previously were used by Västerbotten Regiment.

History 
The center has its origin from the gas technicians who were employed in the Swedish Armed Forces in the 1930s. In 1953 the Army ABC-Defence School (Arméns skyddskola) was formed within Swedish Infantry Combat School (InfSS) in Rosersberg. When InfSS was moved to Linköping the "Skyddskola" was transferred to Svea Life Guards (I 1), with had its former location at Ulriksdal.

In 1968 the school received new tasks and the name was changed to ABC-Defence School of the Armed Forces. 1970 moved the school along with the Svea Life Guards to Kungsängen. On 1 July 1988 the school was separated from the Svea Life Guards, and received new tasks with a focus on Totalförsvaret, with this organizational change, the school changed the name to ABC-Defence School of the Total Defence.

After that the parliament voted for the Government Bill 1987/88: 112, it was decided that the school would be relocated in 1992 to Umeå Garrison.

On 27 July 2009 the last batch of conscripts started their training. Their training took place at Swea kompani at the National CBRN Defence Centre. These were later to be discharge at the 17 June 2010.

Most of the Swedish CBRN expertise is now gathered in Umeå, where SkyddC since autumn 2008 is part of a network that is part of the European CBRNE Center, including the Swedish Defence Research Agency (FOI), Umeå University, Västerbotten County Council and Umeå Municipality.

The Swedish government decided in late 2010 to expand the CBRN focus with an indoor facility at SkyddC. This is to increase the safety of the training with CBRN material. In total around 80 million was to be invested in the facility.

Heraldry and traditions

Colours, standards and guidons
The unit colour was presented to the then ABC-Defence School of the [Swedish] Total Defence (SkyddS) at the Artillery Square in Stockholm by the Supreme Commander, general Owe Wiktorin on 30 April 1996. It is drawn by Bengt Olof Kälde and embroidered by machine in insertion technique by the company Libraria. Blazon: "On white cloth a rampant green dragon, armed red."

Coat of arms
The coat of arms of the Swedish Army ABC/NBC-Defence School 1953–1968 and the ABC-Defence School of the Swedish Armed Forces 1979–1988. Blazon: "Argent, a dragon rampant vert, armed and langued gules. The shield surmounting two swords in saltire or".

The coat of arms of the ABC-Defence School of the Swedish Total Defence 1988–2000 and the National CBRN Defence Centre from 2000. Blazon: "Argent, a dragon rampant vert, armed and langued gules. The shield surmounting an erect sword or".

Medals
In 2012, the Totalförsvarets skyddscentrums förtjänstmedalj (SkyddCGM/SM) of the 8th size in gold/silver was established.

Commanding officers

1952–1956: Major Svante Johan Millqvist
1956–1960: Major Bertil Malgerud
1960–1963: Major Sigvard Månsson
1963–1965: Lieutenant Colonel Ingemar Grunditz
1965–1967: Lieutenant Colonel Hans von Schreeb
1967–1977: Lieutenant Colonel Hans Carlsson
1977–1982: Lieutenant Colonel Sigfrid Tellqvist
1982–1992: Lieutenant Colonel Ingemar Björnsson
1992–1993: Colonel Per-Erik Ritzén
1993–1995: Colonel Gustaf Djurlin
1995–2004: Colonel Dick Stode 
2004–2012: Colonel Gunnar Söderström
2012–2017: Colonel Jan Demarkesse (previously Jan Johansson)
2017–2018: Lieutenant Colonel Michael Magnesten (acting)
2018–present: Colonel Stefan Jansson

Names, designations and locations

Footnotes

References

Notes

Print

Web

External links 

 

Military installations of Sweden
Umeå
Military units and formations established in 1953
Stockholm Garrison
Kungsängen Garrison
Umeå Garrison